Erik Paaske (21 August 1933 – 13 June 1992) was a Danish singer and actor. He appeared in 30 films between 1962 and 1990.

Selected filmography
 Katinka (1988)
 Pelle the Conqueror (1987)
 Me and My Kid Brother and Doggie (1969)
 Crazy Paradise (1962)

External links

1933 births
1992 deaths
Danish male film actors
People from Kolding
20th-century Danish male actors